Antone Behnam AbdulNour (1849- February 1914) was a judge, merchant, and scholar in Mosul during the Ottoman Empire rule.

Early life
Antone AbdulNour was born in 1849 in the city of Mosul when it was still under the rule of the Ottoman Empire. He was born to a prominent Syriac Orthodox family in Mosul and his father, Behnam AbdulNour, was the owner of significant farmland around Mosul as well as an influential figure in the Syriac Orthodox Church in Mosul.

Judge
In 1890, Antone AbdulNour was appointed a judge in the trade court that was established in Mosul under the Ottoman rule.

Career and business
Following in his father's footsteps, Antone AbdulNour started working with his father in managing the farmland together with his other brothers, Mikhael, Fathalla, Butte, and Toma. Additionally, he started a trading business and became a merchant for agricultural goods and products. He and his two cousins, Abdulaziz AbdulNour and Gergees AbdulNour, formed a partnership. The merchants of Mosul used to buy agricultural products from the villages around Mosul and trade them with other regions of the Ottoman Empire like Diyarbakir and Syria. Antone and his cousins also traded with other countries like India and some European countries.

Church affairs
As Antone followed his father's footsteps in business, he also followed his footsteps becoming involved in the church affairs in Mosul and helping the church serving its people in Mosul and other regions where the Syriac Orthodox Church existed. He had a good relationship with the church hierarchy and hosted them in his house. When the hierarchy was assumed to be not listing to its people, Antone didn't hesitate to send strong-worded letters to the Syriac Orthodox Patriarch, Ignatius Abded Aloho II demanding actions to resolve church's problems. In addition to his influential position in the church, he collected ancient Syriac manuscripts and many of them ended in the Mingana Collection at the University of Birmingham, England. He also funded the copying of more than 15 old Syriac manuscripts for the church of India. The recipient of those was priest and scholar Mattai Konat. The copyist was the Mattai Bar Paulos bar Na'matallâh of Mosul.

Death
Antone AbdulNour died in February 1914 after short illness.

References 

1849 births
1914 deaths
People from Mosul
19th-century people of Ottoman Iraq
20th-century people from the Ottoman Empire